Masinga may refer to:

Bennett Masinga (1965–2013), South African footballer
Bridget Masinga (born 1981), South African actress, television and radio personality, fashion model and philanthropist
Phil Masinga (1969–2019), South African professional footballer and manager 
Masinga Constituency, an electoral constituency in Kenya
Masinga Hydroelectric Power Station, Tana River, Kenya

See also
Massinga District, a district of Inhambane Province, Mozambique
760 Massinga, a minor planet